is a Japanese badminton player. Born in Saitama, he graduated from the Saitama Sakae high school, and later educated at the Nippon Sport Science University. He was part of the national junior team that won the bronze medal at the 2007 Asian Junior Championships. Wada made a debut in the international senior tournament in 2008 at the Osaka International, and finished as the mixed doubles semifinalist partnered with Misaki Matsutomo. Teamed-up with Tatsuya Watanabe in the men's doubles, they were the runner-up at the 2011 Osaka International Challenge.

Achievements

BWF International Challenge/Series 
Men's doubles

  BWF International Challenge tournament
  BWF International Series tournament
  BWF Future Series tournament

References

External links 
 

Living people
1990 births
Sportspeople from Saitama Prefecture
Japanese male badminton players
21st-century Japanese people